Zhai Tianlin (born 15 February 1987) is a Chinese actor. He graduated from the 2006 performance undergraduate class of Beijing Film Academy, and he has acted in films and TV series such as Memory of the Youth, Royal Tattoo,  Sinful Debt 2 and The River All Red. In July 2013, he graduated from the 2010 master's school of Acting Department of Beijing Film Academy. In 2014, he was successfully admitted to Beijing Film Academy as a doctoral candidate in Film Science, and received his PhD in June 2018. But in February 2019, his PhD was in dispute because he didn't know what CNKI is. Subsequently, Beijing Film Academy set up an investigation team and launched the investigation process. Zhai's PhD was revoked on February 19, 2019.

Awards and nominations

References 

1987 births
Living people
Chinese male film actors
Male actors from Qingdao
Beijing Film Academy alumni
Peking University alumni
Chinese male television actors
Chinese male stage actors
21st-century Chinese male actors
People involved in plagiarism controversies